The 2019 Brandenburg state election was held on 1 September 2019 to elect the members of the 7th Landtag of Brandenburg. It took place on the same day as the 2019 Saxony state election. The outgoing government was a coalition of the Social Democratic Party (SPD) and The Left, led by Minister-President Dietmar Woidke.

The SPD, Left, and opposition Christian Democratic Union (CDU) suffered substantial losses. The SPD remained the largest party with 26% of votes, followed by the Alternative for Germany (AfD), which doubled its result to 23.5% and moved into second place. The CDU fell to third with 16%. The Greens improved to 11%, though they underperformed compared to prior opinion polling. The Left also recorded a result below expectations, falling from third to fifth place with 11%. The Brandenburg Free Voters (BVB/FW) narrowly passed the 5% electoral threshold and won five seats, up from three.

The incumbent government lost its majority. All parties ruled out cooperation with the AfD, and two possible coalitions were considered: a "Kenya coalition" of the SPD, CDU, and Greens which would hold 50 seats, and a "red-red-green" coalition of the SPD, Greens, and Left, which would hold 45 (a one-seat majority). On 16 November, both the SPD and CDU voted in favour of a Kenya coalition, followed by the Greens on 18 November. Woidke was re-elected Minister-President by the Landtag on 20 November.

Background
Since German reunification, the SPD has been the strongest party in Brandenburg on a state level, and has held the office of Minister-President continuously.

The SPD and Left formed a coalition government after the 2009 state election, which was renewed after the 2014 state election. In the 2019 European Parliament election in Germany, AfD was the strongest party in Brandenburg on 19.9%, ahead of the CDU (18.0%) and SPD (17.2%).

Electoral system
In principle, the Landtag consists of 88 members. 44 are elected by plurality vote in single-member constituencies (direct mandates), and the remainder are filled by party-list proportional representation. The seats are distributed according to the largest remainder method (Hare-Niemeyer method). Only parties whose share of second votes exceeds the 5% electoral threshold or which have won a direct mandate (the "basic mandate clause") are allocated seats. Overhang and leveling seats can expand the Landtag to a maximum size of 110 seats. This is detailed in the Brandenburg State Electoral Act.

According to the state constitution and the state election law, the election date must be a Sunday or a public holiday, at the earliest 57 months and at the latest 60 months after the beginning of the election period. In 2019, the date was set for 1 September 2019.

The minimum voting age is 16 years.

Parties
The table below lists parties represented in the 6th Landtag of Brandenburg.

Opinion polls

Results
By early afternoon, significantly more people had voted than at the same time in the 2014 election. According to the state election director, 31.3% of voters cast their ballots by 2:00 PM. At the time in 2014, the figure was only 22.4%.

{| class=wikitable style="text-align:left; font-size:95%"
| colspan=9 align=center| 
|-
! colspan="2" | Party
! Votes
! %
! +/-
! Seats 
! +/-
! Seats %
|-
| bgcolor=| 
| align=left | Social Democratic Party (SPD)
| align=right| 331,238
| align=right| 26.2
| align=right| 5.7
| align=right| 25
| align=right| 5
| align=right| 28.4
|-
| bgcolor=| 
| align=left | Alternative for Germany (AfD)
| align=right| 297,484
| align=right| 23.5
| align=right| 11.3
| align=right| 23
| align=right| 12
| align=right| 26.1
|-
| bgcolor=| 
| align=left | Christian Democratic Union (CDU)
| align=right| 196,988
| align=right| 15.6
| align=right| 7.4
| align=right| 15
| align=right| 6
| align=right| 17.0
|-
| bgcolor=| 
| align=left | Alliance 90/The Greens (Grüne)
| align=right| 136,364
| align=right| 10.8
| align=right| 4.6
| align=right| 10
| align=right| 4
| align=right| 11.4
|-
| bgcolor=| 
| align=left | The Left (Linke)
| align=right| 135,558
| align=right| 10.7
| align=right| 7.9
| align=right| 10
| align=right| 7
| align=right| 11.4
|-
| bgcolor=|
| align=left | Brandenburg United Civic Movements/Free Voters (BVB/FW)
| align=right| 63,851
| align=right| 5.0
| align=right| 2.3
| align=right| 5
| align=right| 2
| align=right| 5.7
|-
! colspan=8|
|-
| bgcolor=| 
| align=left | Free Democratic Party (FDP)
| align=right| 51,660
| align=right| 4.1
| align=right| 2.6
| align=right| 0
| align=right| ±0
| align=right| 0
|-
| bgcolor=| 
| align=left | Human Environment Animal Protection
| align=right| 32,959
| align=right| 2.6
| align=right| 2.6
| align=right| 0
| align=right| ±0
| align=right| 0
|-
| bgcolor=| 
| align=left | Pirate Party Germany (Piraten)
| align=right| 8,712
| align=right| 0.7
| align=right| 0.8
| align=right| 0
| align=right| ±0
| align=right| 0
|-
| bgcolor=|
| align=left | Others
| align=right| 10,292
| align=right| 0.8
| align=right| 
| align=right| 0
| align=right| ±0
| align=right| 0
|-
! align=right colspan=2| Total
! align=right| 1,265,106
! align=right| 100.0
! align=right| 
! align=right| 88
! align=right| ±0
! align=right| 
|-
! align=right colspan=2| Voter turnout
! align=right| 
! align=right| 61.3
! align=right| 13.4
! align=right| 
! align=right| 
! align=right| 
|}

Government formation
The governing SPD and Die Linke both suffered losses, bringing an end to their coalition. Incumbent Minister-President Woidke (SPD) invited all parties except AfD to coalition negotiations as his party remained the largest bloc. The CDU expressed interest in joining a so-called "Kenya coalition" with SPD and Greens, which would have 50 seats, and reiterated their refusal to govern with AfD. Woidke confirmed he called CDU leader Senftleben on election day to begin discussions, but expressed reservations about the party's poor performance under pressure from the right. He also did not rule out the possibility of a red-red-green coalition with Die Linke and Greens, which would have a bare majority of 45 seats. Greens leader Nonnemacher expressed willingness to participate in either coalition, but made it clear her party would bring its own policy goals to the table and refuse to merely prop up the existing red-red coalition.

On November 16, both the CDU and SPD voted in favor of a "Kenya coalition." The Greens approved the coalition on the 18th; Woidke was duly voted in for his second term as Minister-President two days later by a count of 47 to 37 with 3 abstentions. The coalition commands 50 seats.

Notes

References

External links

2019 elections in Germany
2019